Toilet Door Tits is an EP by Shit and Shine, released on 9 November 2006 by Conspiracy Records. The two extended tracks that comprise the album, "Toilet Door Tits" and "The Biggest Cock in Christendom", would later appear on the compilation Küss Mich, Meine Liebe in 2008.

Track listing

Personnel
Adapted from the Toilet Door Tits liner notes.
Shit and Shine
 Craig Clouse – vocals, instruments

Release history

References 

2006 EPs
Shit and Shine albums